Wakefield Park Historic District is a residential historic district encompassing a portion of a late-19th/early-20th century planned development in western Wakefield, Massachusetts. Most of the properties in the district are on Park Avenue, with a few located on immediately adjacent streets.

The Wakefield Park development was laid out 1888 by J. S. Merrill, a local developer, on land southwest of the town center that had been used as farmland until the 1850s.  Merrill developed some of the properties himself, and instituted deed restrictions on the sale of lots to ensure that the area would contain only high quality upper-middle-class homes.  In the 1890s, when development in the area was at its peak, Merrill partnered with Charles Hanks, who successfully marketed the development as a healthy "garden suburb" alternative to city living.

Architecturally, the houses that were built exhibited a variety of styles popular around the turn of the 20th century, often mixing architectural elements from different styles.  One example of this eclecticism is the house at 8 Park Avenue: built c. 1900, it is a -story wood-frame house with a steeply pitched Colonial Revival-style roof, but with an entrance that is stylistically Craftsman/Bungalow.  Its corner tower is typical of Queen Anne Victorians. A number of houses, including thouse at 2 and 4 Park, combine Shingle and Colonial Revival styles, while 24 Park is a more typical Queen Anne Victorian.

The district was listed on the National Register of Historic Places in 1990.

See also
National Register of Historic Places listings in Wakefield, Massachusetts
National Register of Historic Places listings in Middlesex County, Massachusetts

References

Historic districts in Middlesex County, Massachusetts
Wakefield, Massachusetts
National Register of Historic Places in Wakefield, Massachusetts
Historic districts on the National Register of Historic Places in Massachusetts